Hyporeiae or Hyporeiai was an ancient Greek town located in the region of Acarnania. Its exact location is unknown, although it has been suggested that it should be located in the east of Acarnania, in the border area with Aetolia.

History
Hyporeiae is known through two epigraphic testimonies beginning with a mention of the appointment of the town's theorodokos in circa 356/355 BCE to receive the theoroi of Epidaurus. Also, the town's name also appears in a 4th-century BC funerary inscription from Athens.

See also
List of cities in ancient Epirus

References

Citations

Sources

Populated places in ancient Acarnania
Cities in ancient Epirus
Former populated places in Greece
Lost ancient cities and towns